White River Bridge may refer to:

 White River Bridge, Mount Rainier National Park, Washington state
 White River Bridge at Elkins, Elkins, Arkansas
 White River Bridge (Clarendon, Arkansas)